Privolny is a rural locality (a settlement) and the administrative center of Rostoshinskoye Rural Settlement, Ertilsky District, Voronezh Oblast, Russia. The population was 79 as of 2010.

Geography 
Privolny is located 36 km south of Ertil (the district's administrative centre) by road. Rostoshi is the nearest rural locality.

References 

Rural localities in Ertilsky District